Willard Chiwewe is the Provincial Governor and resident minister of Masvingo, Zimbabwe. He is a member of the ZANU-PF party and an ex officio member of the Senate of Zimbabwe. He was placed on the European Union and United States sanctions lists in 2003.

References

Provincial governors of Zimbabwe
Members of the Senate of Zimbabwe
Living people
Year of birth missing (living people)
People from Masvingo Province
ZANU–PF politicians